The Port of Newcastle is a major seaport in the city of Newcastle, New South Wales, Australia. It is the world's largest coal port.

It is made up of facilities located at Port Hunter - Yohaaba in the Hunter River estuary.  The port was the first commercial export port in Australia and is the world's busiest coal export port.  Annual exports of coal from Newcastle exceeded A$15 billion in 2012–13. Newcastle berthed more than 2,200 ships a year in 2012–13.

The port's harbourmaster is the Port Authority of New South Wales.  Cargo facilities are operated by Port Waratah Coal Services and Newcastle Coal Infrastructure Group at Kooragang Island, as well as other operators at Mayfield, Carrington and Walsh Point.  There are plans to build a cruise terminal.

In April 2014 Premier Mike Baird and Treasurer Andrew Constance announced that a "a consortium which comprises Hastings Funds Management and Chinese state-owned China Merchants" had successfully bid $1.75 billion for a 98-year lease of the Port of Newcastle.

History

Pre-colonial history 

The Awabakal people were the inhabitants of Newcastle (Muloobinba) living around the harbour and foreshore prior to European contact. Discarded shells of shellfish harvested by local clans for thousands of years formed enormous middens which were burned by Europeans to produce lime for building purposes.

In July 2016, Port Hunter was officially dual named Yohaaba, its local Indigenous name.

Shipwrecks 
It has been estimated that over 200 vessels have been lost entering or leaving the Port of Newcastle. Vessels have been recorded lost in and around the areas of Port Hunter, Hunter River, Nobbys Head, Stockton Bight, Stockton Beach (Newcastle Beach), Oyster Bank, Williams River and inland Raymond Terrace.

See also

List of ports in Australia
Port Darwin another port with a 99-year lease with a Chinese company

References

Newcastle